A Thermochemical Equation is a balanced stoichiometric chemical equation that includes the enthalpy change, ΔH.  In variable form, a thermochemical equation would look like this:

A + B → C

ΔH = (±) #

Where {A, B, C} are the usual agents of a chemical equation with coefficients and “(±) #” is a positive or negative numerical value, usually with units of kJ.

Understanding Aspects of Thermochemical Equations

Enthalpy (H) is the transfer of energy in a reaction (for chemical reactions it is in the form of heat) and ΔH is the change in enthalpy.  ΔH is a state function.  Being a state function means that ΔH is independent of the processes between initial and final states.  In other words, it does not matter what steps we take to get from initial reactants to final products—the ΔH will always be the same.  ΔHrxn, or the change in enthalpy of a reaction, has the same value of ΔH as in a thermochemical equation, but is in units of kJ/mol being that it is the enthalpy change per moles of any particular substance in the equation.  Values of ΔH are determined experimentally under standard conditions of 1atm and 25 °C (298.15K).

As discussed earlier, ΔH can have a positive or negative sign.  A positive sign means that the system uses heat and is endothermic.  The negative value means that heat is produced and the system is exothermic.

Endothermic: A + B + Heat → C, ΔH > 0

Exothermic: A + B → C + Heat, ΔH < 0

Since enthalpy is a state function, the ΔH given for a particular reaction is only true for that exact reaction.  Physical states (of reactants or products) matter, as do molar concentrations.

This matter of ΔH being dependent on physical state and molar concentration means that thermochemical equations must be stoichiometrically correct.  If one agent of the equation is changed through multiplication, then all agents must be proportionally changed, including ΔH.  (See Manipulating Thermochemical Equations, below.)

Thermochemical equation’s multiplicative property is largely due to the First Law of Thermodynamics, which says that energy can be neither created nor destroyed, a concept commonly known as the conservation of energy.  It holds true on a physical or molecular scale.

Manipulating thermochemical equations

Coefficient multiplication 
Thermochemical equations can be changed, as mentioned above, by multiplying by any numerical coefficient.  All agents must be multiplied, including ΔH.  Using the thermochemical equation of variables as above, one gets the following example.

A + B → C

ΔH= (±) #

Assume that one needs to multiply A by two in order to use the thermochemical equation (as in addition, below). One must then multiply all the agents in the reaction by the same coefficient, like so:

2A + 2B → 2C

2ΔH= 2[(±) #]

This is again logical when the First Law of Thermodynamics is considered.  Twice as much product is produced, so twice as much heat is removed or given off.

Division of coefficients works in the same way.

Hess’s Law: Addition of Thermochemical Equations 
Hess’s Law states that the sum of the energy changes of all the thermochemical equations included in an overall reaction is equal to the overall energy change.  Since ΔH is a state function and so is not dependent on how the reactants become the products, we can use several steps (in the form of several thermochemical equations) to find the ΔH of the overall reaction.

Example:

Reaction (1)  C(graphite, s) + O2(g) → CO2(g)

This reaction comes about via two steps (a reaction sequence):

C(graphite, s) + ½O2(g) → CO(g)

ΔH = −110.5 kJ

CO(g) + ½O2(g) → CO2(g)

ΔH = −283.0 kJ

We want to add these two reactions together to get Reaction (1) so that we can find ΔH, so we check to make sure that agents in the reaction sequence not present in (1) cancel each other.  In this example, CO(g) is not in (1) and cancels.  We add the reaction sequence together.

C(graphite, s) + ½O2(g) + ½O2(g) → CO2(g)

or

C(graphite, s) + O2(g) → CO2(g), Reaction (1)

To figure out ΔH, we add the ΔH of the two equations in the reaction sequence:

(−110.5 kJ) + (−283.0 kJ) = (−393.5 kJ) = ΔH of Reaction (1) EXAMPLE OF THERMOCHEMICAL EQUATION IS When methane gas is combusted, heat is released, making the reaction exothermic. ... In the process, 890.4 kJ is released and so it is written as a product of the reaction. A thermochemical equation is a chemical equation that includes the enthalpy change of the reaction.

Some things to remember 
If you have to reverse a reaction to get things to cancel, the sign of ΔH must also be reversed.  
If you have to multiply an agent to get it to cancel, all other agents and ΔH must also be multiplied by that number.
Generally ΔH values given in tables are under 1atm and 25 °C (298.15 K), so be aware of what conditions your reaction is under.

Where to Find Values of ΔH
Values of ΔH have been experimentally determined and are available in table form.  Most general chemistry textbooks have appendixes including common ΔH values.  There are several online tables available.  For more extensive information there is software offered with Active Thermochemical Tables (ATcT), available online.

See also 
Chemistry
Thermochemistry
Chemical Reaction
Enthalpy

References 
Atkins, Peter and Loretta Jones.  2005.  Chemical Principles, the Quest for Insight (3rd edition). W. H. Freeman and Co., New York, NY.

External links
General chemistry information index:  http://chemistry.about.com/library/blazlist4.htm
Further step by step help on Hess’s Law: http://members.aol.com/profchm/hess.html

Thermochemistry